Sever do Vouga is a town and a municipality in the District of Aveiro in Portugal The population in 2011 was 12,356, in an area of 129.88 km2. It had 11,734 eligible voters (2013). The municipality is a center of metalworking industry.

The municipality is included in the Região de Aveiro.

The present Mayor is António José Martins Coutinho, elected by the Socialist Party.

The municipal holiday is the September 21.

Demographics

Parishes
Administratively, the municipality is divided into 7 civil parishes (freguesias):
 Cedrim e Paradela
 Couto de Esteves
 Pessegueiro do Vouga
 Rocas do Vouga
 Sever do Vouga
 Silva Escura e Dornelas
 Talhadas

Famous people

Martin Silva (born 1952 in Sever do Vouga) politician and radio personality in Toronto, Ontario, Canada.
Luísa Beirão (born 1977 in Sever do Vouga) a Portuguese model.

References

External links
Municipality official website
Sever do Vouga's Philharmonic Band
Photos from Sever do Vouga

 
Municipalities of Aveiro District
Towns in Portugal